Martha Hill is an American para-alpine skier. She represented the United States at the 1984 Winter Paralympics and at the 1988 Winter Paralympics in alpine skiing.

Career 
At the 1984 Winter Paralympics, she finished fourth in downhill, fifth in super combined, and sixth, both in slalom, and giant slalom.

At the 1988 Winter Paralympics, she won the silver medals in the Women's Downhill LW2 event and in the Women's Slalom LW2 event.

She also competed in disabled skiing, a demonstration sport at the 1988 Winter Olympics.

Personal life
Hill is the mother of Stacy Gaskill who represented the United States at the 2022 Winter Olympics held in Beijing, China.

References 

Living people
Year of birth missing (living people)
Place of birth missing (living people)
Paralympic alpine skiers of the United States
American female alpine skiers
Alpine skiers at the 1984 Winter Paralympics
Alpine skiers at the 1988 Winter Paralympics
Medalists at the 1988 Winter Paralympics
Paralympic silver medalists for the United States
American amputees
Paralympic medalists in alpine skiing
21st-century American women